The 430s decade ran from January 1, 430, to December 31, 439.

Significant people

References